Carabus exiguus is a species of black-coloured ground beetle in the Carabinae subfamily that is endemic to China.

Subspecies
The species have 10 subspecies, all of which could be found in China:
Carabus exiguus absconditus Imura, 2002
Carabus exiguus cithara Cavazzuti, 2002
Carabus exiguus evae Brezina et Hackel, 2007
Carabus exiguus exiguus Semenov, 1898
Carabus exiguus fanianus Imura, 1993
Carabus exiguus lanzhouicus Deuve, 1989
Carabus exiguus nivium Breuning, 1933
Carabus exiguus ochotonarum Brezina, 1996
Carabus exiguus tagong Kleinfeld & Puchner, 2007
Carabus exiguus wudumontanus Imura, 1998

References

exiguus
Beetles described in 1924
Endemic fauna of China
Taxa named by Andrey Semyonov-Tyan-Shansky